N-acetylglutamate synthetase may refer to:
 Amino-acid N-acetyltransferase
 Glutamate N-acetyltransferase
 Urea cycle